The 2009–10 season was Gold Coast United's inaugural season in the A-League, becoming one of two new expansion clubs in the Australian state of Queensland.

Season review

Transfers

In

Out

Loans in

Released

Squad

Friendlies

Competitions

A-League

League table

Results summary

Results by matchday

Results

A-League Finals

Squad statistics

Appearances and goals

|-
|colspan="14"|Players who left Gold Coast United during the season:

|}

Goal scorers

Disciplinary record

Notes

References

External links
Official website 

Gold Coast United FC seasons
G